Tommyland: The Ride is the second solo album by the Mötley Crüe drummer Tommy Lee. It was released in 2005 on TL Education Services Inc.

Background
Tommyland: The Ride was released in conjunction with Lee's book of the same name, as well as his then new reality television series Tommy Lee Goes to College, which premiered a week after the album was released. The album features tracks from the show. Among these is the first single "Tryin to Be Me" and the second single "Good Times", which is the theme song for the series.
The first three singles: "Tryin to Be Me", "Good Times" and "Hello Again" all featured Music videos.

Several other musicians also make guest appearances, including Butch Walker on "Good Times", Chad Kroeger on the first single "Tryin to Be Me", and Nick Carter on "Say Goodbye".

Track listing

Personnel

Tommy Lee — drums, producer, vocals, background vocals
Scott Humphrey — guitar, keyboards, mixing, producer
Andrew McMahon — piano, vocals
Phil X — lead guitar, background vocals
Deryck Whibley - guitar
Dave Navarro — lead guitar
Nick Lashley — guitar
Carl Bell — lead guitar
Bobby "Raw" Anderson — guitar
Chad Kroeger — guitar
Tim Dawson — guitar
Chris Chaney — bass guitar
Patrick Warren — keyboards
Carla Kihlstedt — violin
Matt Sorum — background vocals
Joel Madden - co lead vocals on "Tired"
Butch Walker - vocals, guitar, bass
Will Campagna - guitar
Tommy Mac - bass guitar
Earl Crispin -vocals/backing vocals, guitar, drums
Randy Staub — mixing
Tom Baker — mastering
Chris Baseford — engineer

Charts

Album

Singles

References

External links
lyrics

2005 albums
Tommy Lee albums
Albums produced by Scott Humphrey